Callipeltin A and B are bio-active isolates of marine invertebrates.

See also
 Depsipeptide
 Papuamide

References

Depsipeptides